Surur is a village located in Wai taluka at Satara District, Maharashtra, India.

Villages in Satara district